Bicyclus evadne, the small stately bush brown, is a butterfly in the family Nymphalidae. It is found in Guinea, Sierra Leone, Liberia, Ivory Coast, Ghana, Nigeria, Cameroon, Gabon, the Republic of the Congo and the Democratic Republic of the Congo. The habitat consists of forests.

Subspecies
Bicyclus evadne evadne (Guinea, Sierra Leone, Liberia, western Ivory Coast)
Bicyclus evadne elionias (Hewitson, 1866) (eastern Ivory Coast, Ghana, eastern Nigeria, Cameroon, Gabon, Congo, Democratic Republic of the Congo)

References

Elymniini
Butterflies described in 1779